Joselito vagabundo ("Joselito Vagabond") is a 1966 Mexican film. It stars Sara García and is directed by Miguel Morayta.

External links
 

1966 films
Mexican comedy films
1960s Spanish-language films
1960s Mexican films